John Walter Ehle (May 11, 1873 – July 25, 1927) was a Fireman First Class serving in the United States Navy during the Spanish–American War who received the Medal of Honor for bravery.

Biography
Ehle was born May 11, 1873,  in Kearney, Nebraska and after entering the navy he was sent to fight in the Spanish–American War aboard the U.S.S. Concord as a Fireman First Class.

He died July 25, 1927, and was buried in Saint Mary Cemetery Oakland, California.

Medal of Honor citation
Rank and organization: Fireman First Class, U.S. Navy. Born: 11 May 1873, Kearney, Nebr. Accredited to: Nebraska. G.O. No.: 502 14 December 1898.

Citation:

On board the U.S.S. Concord off Cavite, Manila Bay, Philippine Islands, 21 May 1898. Following the blowing out of a lower manhole plate joint on boiler B of that vessel, Ehle assisted in hauling the fires in the hot, vapor_filled atmosphere which necessitated the playing of water into the fireroom from a hose.

See also

List of Medal of Honor recipients for the Spanish–American War

References

External links

1873 births
1927 deaths
United States Navy Medal of Honor recipients
United States Navy sailors
American military personnel of the Spanish–American War
People from Kearney, Nebraska
Spanish–American War recipients of the Medal of Honor